El Dorado Hills (El Dorado, Spanish for "The Golden") is an unincorporated town and census-designated place in El Dorado County, California. Located in the Greater Sacramento region of Northern California, it had a population was 50,547 at the 2020 census, up from 42,108 at the 2010 census. El Dorado Hills is primarily an affluent suburb of Sacramento.

History

During the California Gold Rush, gold was washed down the South Fork of the American River, into areas now in El Dorado Hills and Folsom, but farming and ranching supplanted mining or panning for gold. Portions of two Pony Express routes in this area from 1860 to 1861 remain as modern El Dorado Hills roads.

The modern history of El Dorado Hills dates back to the early 1960s when original developer Allan Lindsey began its development as a master-planned community. The original master plan, prepared by architect Victor Gruen, covered the area generally north of U.S. Highway 50, and part of the area south of US 50 now considered to be part of the community. El Dorado Hills was envisioned as a large-scale master-planned community that would be completely planned from its inception as a group of residential "villages". Other land uses in the master plan included a business park, 18-hole golf course, community parks, schools, a community shopping center, and small commercial centers in each village. The master plan emphasized open space between villages and the opportunity for outdoor recreation.

Between the late 1960s and mid-1990s, growth occurred at a moderate pace as new families relocated from Sacramento, Southern California and the Bay Area. This growth consisted primarily of residential housing, as retail developments were limited to two shopping centers on the corners Green Valley & Francisco and El Dorado Hills Boulevard & US 50. Each neighborhood created during this time period was given a name and referred to as a "village" by local inhabitants. The original villages of El Dorado Hills include Ridgeview, Park, Saint Andrews, Crown, and Governors. In the 1980s and 1990s, the major part of Lake Hills Estates north of Green Valley Road was reorganized into Lake Forest Village, containing the neighborhoods of Waterford, The Summit, Green Valley Hills, Winterhaven, Marina Woods and Windsor Point. Additional villages that have developed subsequently include Fairchild, Sterlingshire, Highland Hills, Highland View, Bridlewood, Hills of El Dorado, Woodridge, Laurel Oaks and the master-planned community of Serrano.

The El Dorado Hills Town Center, just south of US 50, is a mixed-use project developed by The Mansour Company. Occupying 100 acres of land and, at completion, one million square feet of buildings, it is the center of town and of the region.

Geography

El Dorado Hills (EDH), as defined by the 2010 census-designated place (CDP), is at the western border of El Dorado County, between the City of Folsom and the unincorporated community of Cameron Park. The northern limits of the CDP are Folsom Lake and the South Fork of the American River, where river rafters use Skunk Hollow and Salmon Falls as takeout landings. West of Latrobe Road, the south edge of the CDP follows railroad tracks formerly used by the Southern Pacific between the cities of Folsom and Placerville. East of Latrobe Road the south edge follows topography running roughly east–west.

The subsurface environment of El Dorado Hills is relatively free of groundwater and soil contamination, based upon an areawide analysis of the potential for pesticide contamination and evaluation of underground storage tanks.(Earth Metrics, 1989)

Climate
According to the Köppen climate classification, El Dorado Hills has a hot-summer Mediterranean climate (abbreviated Csa).

Demographics

2020 
As of the 2020 United States Census, El Dorado Hills had a population of 50,547, with 16,212 households. Its total population's racial makeup was 39,636 (84.1%) White, 1,209 (2.6%) Black or African-American, 815 (1.7%) American Indian and Alaska Native, 6,964 (14.8%) Asian, 404 (0.9%) Pacific Islander, 1,419 (3.2%) from some other race, with 3,158 (6.7%) of two or more races. 3,820 (8.1%) people of any race were Hispanic or Latino. While there were other small changes in racial makeup, this census saw the greatest increase in the proportion of Asian-identified people (+ 6.3%) in comparison to the 2010 census.

2010
The 2010 United States Census reported that El Dorado Hills had a population of 42,108. The racial makeup of El Dorado Hills was 35,089 (83.3%) White, 615 (1.5%) African American, 196 (0.5%) Native American, 3,563 (8.5%) Asian, 71 (0.2%) Pacific Islander, 681 (1.6%) from other races, and 1,893 (4.5%) from two or more races. Hispanic or Latino of any race were 3,802 persons (9.0%).

The Census reported that 42,092 people (100% of the population) lived in households, 16 (0%) lived in non-institutionalized group quarters, and 0 (0%) were institutionalized.

There were 14,368 households, out of which 6,516 (45.4%) had children under the age of 18 living in them, 10,503 (73.1%) were opposite-sex married couples living together, 1,070 (7.4%) had a female householder with no husband present, 490 (3.4%) had a male householder with no wife present. There were 464 (3.2%) unmarried opposite-sex partnerships, and 85 (0.6%) same-sex married couples or partnerships. 1,798 households (12.5%) were made up of individuals, and 670 (4.7%) had someone living alone who was 65 years of age or older. The average household size was 2.93. There were 12,063 families (84.0% of all households); the average family size was 3.20.

The population was spread out, with 12,430 people (29.5%) under the age of 18, 2,511 people (6.0%) aged 18 to 24, 9,455 people (22.5%) aged 25 to 44, 13,232 people (31.4%) aged 45 to 64, and 4,480 people (10.6%) who were 65 years of age or older. The median age was 40.6 years. For every 100 females, there were 97.5 males. For every 100 females age 18 and over, there were 94.7 males.

The homeowner vacancy rate was 1.7%; the rental vacancy rate was 4.1%. 35,755 people (84.9% of the population) lived in owner-occupied housing units and 6,337 people (15.0%) lived in rental housing units.

2000
As of the census of 2000, there were 18,016 people, 5,896 households, and 5,206 families residing in the CDP. SACOG's estimate for December, 2003 was 9,713 dwelling units.

The Census Bureaus's assessment of racial makeup of the CDP was 90.11% White, 0.77% Black or African American, 0.46% Native American, 4.11% Asian, 0.17% Pacific Islander, 1.37% from other races, and 3.01% from two or more races. 4.97% of the population were Hispanic or Latino of any race.

There were 5,896 households, out of which 50.7% had children under the age of 18 living with them, 79.5% were married couples living together, 6.5% had a female householder with no husband present, and 11.7% were non-families. 9.4% of all households were made up of individuals, and 2.7% had someone living alone who was 65 years of age or older. The average household size was 3.06 and the average family size was 3.26.

In the CDP, the population distribution was 33.2% under the age of 18, 4.5% from 18 to 24, 29.4% from 25 to 44, 25.6% from 45 to 64, and 7.3% who were 65 years of age or older. The median age was 38 years. For every 100 females, there were 99.3 males. For every 100 females age 18 and over, there were 96.0 males.

According to a 2007 estimate, the median income for a household in the CDP was $113,927, and the median income for a family was $125,230. Males had a median income of $75,369 versus $45,978 for females. The per capita income for the CDP was $40,239. 1.7% of the population and 1.5% of families were below the poverty line. Out of the total population, 1.5% of those under the age of 18 and 2.2% of those 65 and older were living below the poverty line.

El Dorado Hills is among the highest income communities of its size range in the nation, though this is seldom noted because of its unincorporated status. El Dorado Hills would rank 3rd highest by median household income in a list of places with population greater than 40,000, following only Potomac, Maryland and Danville, California.

Total population within the El Dorado Hills Community Services District (CSD) was certified as 35,276 in January, 2006 by the California State Department of Finance. The El Dorado Hills Fire Department reported a population of 42,078 in its service area at the end of 2007. The Fire Department's district covers a larger geographic area than the CSD and is more nearly equivalent to the El Dorado County definition of the El Dorado Hills Community Region.

Government

As an unincorporated area, the local government of El Dorado Hills is that of El Dorado County. Two supervisorial districts include parts of El Dorado Hills. District 1 is represented by John Hidahl and District 2 by Shiva Frentzen.

A number of services are provided by other local agencies. These include the El Dorado Hills Community Services District (CSD), the Rolling Hills Community Services District (CSD), the Marble Mountain Community Services District, the El Dorado Hills County Water District (fire department), and the El Dorado Irrigation District.

Notable people
 Cimorelli – YouTube singing group consisting of six sisters; born in El Dorado Hills, but now live in Nashville, Tennessee.
 Austin Collie – NFL wide receiver, Indianapolis Colts, Brigham Young University
 Ryan Anderson – NBA power forward, Houston Rockets, UC Berkeley
 Seyi Ajirotutu – NFL wide receiver – San Diego Chargers
 Derrek Lee – first baseman, Atlanta Braves
 F. P. Santangelo – a former American professional baseball player (1995–2001) who played for the Montreal Expos, San Francisco Giants, Los Angeles Dodgers, and Oakland Athletics.
 Rick Schu – a former American professional baseball player and current Assistant Hitting Coach for the San Francisco Giants.
 Joe Angel – Retired sportscaster
 Jacoby Shaddix – lead singer, Papa Roach
 Cheri Elliott – champion cyclist, including two X-Games Gold Medals, United States Bicycling Hall of Fame and the National BMX Hall of Fame.
 Ian Book – quarterback of the Notre Dame Fighting Irish football team. Graduate of Oak Ridge High School. Led NCAA in Quarterback completion percentage (74.8%) for the 2018–2019 season. Drafted by the New Orleans Saints in the 4th round, 133rd overall, of the 2021 NFL draft.
 Joanne Witt -- murder victim, stabbed to death on June 11, 2009 by her teenage daughter and her daughter's boyfriend

References

Bibliography
 C. Michael Hogan and Marc Papineau, "Phase I Environmental Site Assessment", Four Mile Search Area, El Dorado Hills, California, March 7, 1989
 El Dorado Local Agency Formation Committee, "Final Environmental Impact Report for the Incorporation of El Dorado Hills", May 12, 2005

External links
 Clarksville Region Historical Society
 El Dorado Hills Chamber of Commerce
 El Dorado Hills Community Services District
 El Dorado Hills Town Center, El Dorado Hills, CA

Census-designated places in El Dorado County, California
Census-designated places in California